The Monument of Independence is a monument in Vlorë, Albania, dedicated to the Albanian Declaration of Independence and worked by Albanian sculptors, Muntaz Dhrami and Kristaq Rama. 
It is found in the Flag's Plaza, near the building where the first Albanian government worked in 1913.

In the center of the monument is the sculpture of Ismail Qemali, the leader of the Albanian national movement and founder of Independent Albania.

References

External links
 View of the monument

Buildings and structures in Vlorë
Monuments and memorials in Albania
National symbols of Albania
Tourist attractions in Vlorë County
National personifications
Colossal statues
1972 sculptures